Jack Short may refer to:

 Jack Short (betrayer of William Wallace)
 Jack Short (cricketer) (born 1951), Irish cricketer
 Jack Short (footballer), English footballer
 Jack Short, co-founder of Factory Green, an eco-friendly clothing and accessories company

See also
 John Short (disambiguation)